Picocon is the name given to a series of British science fiction conventions run by the Imperial College Science Fiction and Fantasy Society (ICSF),. Taking place on a Saturday (occasionally extended to Sunday), in February or early March in Imperial College's Blackett Building since 1984.

T-shirts and other merchandise related to the convention are typically emblazoned with the Greek letters  (psi, phi), which can be read as Sci-Fi. Roles in organising the convention include the Sofa ("like a chair, only comfier") and the Beanbag.

The reason for the event numbering (Picocon, Picocon Pi, Picocon 4, ⋯) of the first conventions is unclear. One suggestion is that there was a predecessor Picocon event watching videos and playing board games, and that the first formal event with a guest speaker is therefore Picocon 2.

List of Picocons

GoH Notes
One line introductions for a Guests of Honour who don't (yet) have a Wikipedia biography page, e.g. linking a creator to a bibliography, filmography or an example book (series), podcast, piece/series of art, etc

References

External links
 Convention home page
 Review of Picocon from 2000 
 text of a talk given at Picocon in 1996 by author Stephen Baxter 

Science fiction conventions in the United Kingdom
1984 establishments in England